The Askaryan Radio Array (ARA) is a new detector designed to detect a few GZK neutrinos a year. It measures the enhanced radio-frequency radiation emitted during the interaction of the neutrino in Antarctic ice sheet. The detection is based on the Askaryan effect, an idea by Gurgen Askaryan

This detection technique is also being used by the Antarctic Impulse Transient Antenna (ANITA) and the Radio Ice Cerenkov Experiment (RICE) detectors. The ARA experiment will be built around the IceCube experiment, and will cover an area of approximately 100 square kilometers.

A 16-antenna prototype station, the "ARA Testbed" , of the ARA system was installed January 2011 (season 2010–2011) and began operation allowing the ARA Collaboration to determine the estimated sensitivity of the array design:  ARA-37 will cover 200 km2  with neutrino sensitivity of 1016–1019 eV.  Measurements of the radio background and ice attenuation length were reported.

The first ARA station was installed in the season (Antarctic summer season; winter in northern hemisphere) 2011–2012; stations 2 and 3 were installed in the season 2012–2013 and stations 4 and 5 in season 2017–2018. The ARA array had five stations as of 2018. The Phase 1 goal of ARA is 37 stations.

Collaborators
 University of Delaware
 University of Hawaii
 University of Kansas
 University of Maryland
University of Nebraska
 University of Wisconsin
 Free University of Brussels (IIHE)
 Ohio State University
 National Taiwan University
 University College London
 Technion – Israel Institute of Technology
 Weizmann Institute of Science
 University of Chicago

References

Further reading 
 

 Askaryan Radio Array Home Page

Neutrino observatories